The Communauté de communes des Pays d'Oise et d'Halatte is a communauté de communes located in the Oise département and in the Hauts-de-France région of France. It was created in December 1997 and its seat is Pont-Sainte-Maxence. It includes 17 communes with a population of about 34,000 inhabitants.

Territory

Geography 
The communauté de communes is located in the heart of the Oise valley, 60 km north from Paris, between Creil and Compiègne, 6 km away from the A1 highway and 40 km away from the Charles De Gaulle airport.

About half of its territory is located within the scope of the Parc naturel régional Oise-Pays de France, and seven of its municipalities are located on the river Oise.

The territory, with an area of 139.5 km2, had a population of 34,240 in 2018.

Composition 
The communauté de communes consists of the following 17 communes:

Les Ageux
Angicourt
Bazicourt
Beaurepaire
Brenouille
Cinqueux
Monceaux
Pontpoint
Pont-Sainte-Maxence
Rhuis
Rieux
Roberval
Sacy-Le-Petit
Sacy-Le-Grand
Saint-Martin-Longueau
Verneuil-en-Halatte
Villeneuve-sur-Verberie

See also 

 Communes of the Oise department

References 

Oise et d'Halatte
Oise et d'Halatte